Ramapuram is a village in Annamayya district of the Indian state of Andhra Pradesh. It is located in Ramapuram mandal of Rayachoti revenue division.
The village has around 150 families with Ram temple, primary school. Kadapa is 44 km away.

References

Villages in Annamayya district